The 2015 Nigerian House of Representatives elections in Nasarawa State was held on March 28, 2015, to elect members of the House of Representatives to represent Nasarawa State, Nigeria.

Overview

Summary

Results

Nasarawa/Toto 
APC candidate Musa Onwana Baba won the election, defeating other party candidates.

Lafia/Obi 
APC candidate Abubakar Sarki Dahiru won the election, defeating other party candidates.

Keffi/Karu/Kokona  
PDP candidate Gaza Jonathan Gbefwi won the election, defeating other party candidates.

Awe/Doma/Keana 
PDP candidate Mohammed Ogoshi Onawo won the election, defeating other party candidates.

Akwanga/Nasarawa/Eggon/Wamba 
PDP candidate David Ombugadu won the election, defeating other party candidates.

References 

Nasarawa State House of Representatives elections